Iridomyrmex agilis is an ant of the genus Iridomyrmex. They are distributed throughout most of Australia. They are  usually found in the drier regions of Australia. The species was described by Forel in 1907.

References

Iridomyrmex
Hymenoptera of Australia
Insects described in 1907